Clarence Francis "Pop" Foster (April 4, 1878 – April 16, 1944) was a Major League Baseball outfielder who played for the New York Giants, Washington Senators and Chicago White Sox. He played a total of 18 seasons in baseball, four at the Major League level and 14 in minor league baseball.

Professional career

New York Giants
He batted .268 with 30 hits, six doubles and nine RBIs.

In  Foster hit .296 with 89 hits, nine doubles, seven triples, three home runs 57 RBIs and seven stolen bases in 84 games. Foster established a career high in batting average.

In Foster's final season with the Giants in  he hit .262 with 22 hits, three doubles and 11 RBIs in 31 games.

Washington Senators
 was a career year for Foster with the Washington Senators. He hit .278 with 109 hits, 16 doubles, nine triples, six home runs, 54 RBIs and 10 stolen bases in 103 games. Despite his good play Foster was released by the Senators on September 9, 1901.

Chicago White Stockings
The day Foster was released by the Senators, the Chicago White Sox of the American League signed Foster. He finished the season with Chicago batting .286 with 10 hits, two doubles, two triples, one home run and six RBIs. He finished the season with career highs in at bats, runs, hits, doubles, triples, home runs, RBIs, stolen bases, walks, on-base percentage, slugging percentage and on-base plus slugging.

Legacy
Foster did not appear in the majors after 1901. He continued to play in Minor League Baseball for 14 seasons. Foster made stops in Providence, Rhode Island, Montreal, Quebec, Bridgeport, Connecticut and Newark, New Jersey.

In  Foster began to manage the Lancaster Red Roses of the Tri-State League. He would stay with the Red Roses until .

In 262 games in the major leagues, Foster hit .281 with 260 hits, 36 doubles, 20 triples, 10 home runs and 137 RBIs.

Yale men's basketball coach
In addition to playing professional baseball, Foster also coached the Yale University men's basketball team for the 1912–13 collegiate basketball season. The Bulldogs finished with a 5–7 record in his lone season at the helm.

References

External links

1878 births
1944 deaths
Baseball player-managers
Baseball players from New Haven, Connecticut
Basketball coaches from Connecticut
Chicago White Sox players
Lancaster Red Roses players
Montreal Royals players
New Haven Murlins players
New York Giants (NL) players
NYU Violets baseball players
Sportspeople from New Haven, Connecticut
Portsmouth Truckers players
Providence Grays (minor league) players
Trenton Tigers players
Washington Senators (1901–1960) players
Yale Bulldogs men's basketball coaches
19th-century baseball players
NYU Violets football players
NYU Violets men's basketball players